Humberto Waldemar Asdrúbal Baeza Fernández (9 December 1942 – 11 February 2023), also known as Tito Fernández, El Temucano, was a Chilean singer-songwriter and folklorist. He recorded and released more than 40 albums from the 1970s to the present.

Fernández was born in Temuco but moved to Santiago as a teenager. In his 20s, he began singing in pubs and bars in the north of Chile, Peru, and Bolivia. He was imprisoned during the battle between the Bolivian army and Che Guevara's guerrillas.

Fernández returned to Chile in 1971. He moved to Santiago where he recorded his music and shared the stage several times with Victor Jara. He was also active with the Juventudes Comunistas de Chile. However, unlike other singers of the Nueva Canción Chilena, Fernández also had followers within the military and right-wing.

After the military coup in 1973, he was assigned to deliver Victor Jara's wedding ring to his widow. Fernández was himself detained by the military after the coup and imprisoned for a short time at the Escuela de Aviación, where he had studied in his youth. He was given the work of being a waiter serving military personnel at the school. He was released after a short time and remained in Chile rather than living in exile. However, he was not permitted to perform live, and his more left-wing albums were censored.

Over the years, he became close to members of the Central Nacional de Informaciones (CNI). This led to disagreements with artists of the Nueva Canción Chilena who no longer considered him to be part of their musical movement.

Fernández claimed to have had an encounter with UFOs on a highway while traveling to Antofagasta in 1974. In 1988, he founded the Centro Integral de Estudios Metafísicos (CIEM). In 2018, a member of CIEM accused Fernández of raping her. He was charged with rape in July 2020.

Awards and honours
 Premio APES 1973
 Premio Alerce 1977
 Premio Alerce 1978
 Hijo Ilustre de la Ciudad de Temuco (1991)
 Hijo Ilustre de la Comuna Lo Espejo (1993)
 Homenaje del Congreso Nacional de Chile (19 de junio de 1996)
 Festival de Viña del Mar 1997: primer premio en música de raíz folclórica con la canción Cartagena, de Claudio Guzmán
 Triple Disco de Platino en 1999, ARCI-MUSIC, por ventas de Los 20 mejores
 Premio APES 2000
 Gaviota de Oro en el Festival de Viña del Mar 2001
 Premio Altazor 2001, categoría Música tradicional o de raíz floclórica por 40 años del cantor popular
 Premio a la Música Presidente de la República 2001
 Disco de Platino en 2002, Doble M - Warner, por ventas de 40 años del cantor popular
 Distinción del Club de Huasos Gil Letelier 2002
 Antorcha de Plata en el Festival de Viña del Mar 2003
 Antorchas y Gaviotas de Plata y Oro en el Festival de Viña del Mar 2004
 Hijo Ilustre de la Municipalidad de Temuco (2004)
 Disco de Oro en 2004, Doble M - Warner, por producción de 40 años del cantor popular. Segunda parte
 Gran Pionero de la Cuenca de Baker (2005, Municipalidad de la ciudad de Cochrane)
 Figura Fundamental de la Música Chilena (2010, Sociedad Chilena del Derecho de Autor)

Books 
 Páginas de mi diario, libro autobiográfico
 El mensaje inicial, autoayuda, Editorial Minks, 1996
 El mensaje de Siro, autoayuda
 El mensaje terrestre, autoayuda
 Antología poética, Sociedad del Derecho de Autor, 2003
 Los versos numerados, autobiografía en verso, Ril Editores, 2012

Discography

 1971 - El Temucano
 1971 - Tito Fernández, el Temucano
 1972 - Al amor
 1973 - Boleros
 1974 - Tito Fernández
 1974 - Entre nos
 1975 - Me gusta el vino
 1975? - Seis canciones y un cuento
 1976? - De chincol a jote
 1976? - Profeta en mi tierra
 1976? - Somos (con Patricia Chávez)
 1978 - Con amor de hombre
 1978 - Todo lo que tengo es mi ciudad
 1978? - Chile
 1978? - En la senda internacional
 1981 - El caminero Mendoza
 1982 - Y sigo siendo chileno
 1983 - La ciudad
 1984 - Más chileno que nunca
 1985 - Yo paso y canto
 1985 - Mañana me voy de viaje
 1986 - Así es la cosa
 1987 - El canto del Temucano
 1988 - Verónica y Tito Fernández
 1989 - Cuartetas divertidas
 198X - Tito Fernández y Patty Chávez (con Patricia Chávez)
 1990 - Yo vengo cantando, hermano
 1992 - Lota
 1992 - ¡Viva Chile, mierda!
 1993 - Reflexiones y otras cosas
 1994 - A mis compañeros
 1995 - Dios los cría y el canto los junta (con Carlos Vásquez)
 1996 - A todo bolero (con Lu Rivera)
 1997 - Suélteme la manga
 1997 - Mis ciudades
 1998 - El atrinque
 1999 - El humor de Tito Fernández
 2000 - Boleros
 2000 - Cantan al amor
 2001 - El enamorado
 2002 - El caminero Mendoza
 2003 - 40 años del cantor popular, vol. 1 y 2
 2003 - El asa'o
 2005 - Por amor al bolero (con Lu Rivera)
 2005 - Tito Fernández & Las Voces Nuevas. 35 años después
 2005 - Nuestra Navidad chilena
 2005 - La fonda de El Temucano
 2006 - Tonada y tradición
 Epopeya de las comidas y bebidas de Chile
 Nosotros los cantores
 Tito Fernández el Temucano en vivo
 El humor del Temucano en vivo
 Lo mejor de mi tierra
 200 años Chile y su floclore
 50 años de canto 200 historias
 Los versos numerados

Singles 
 Yo soy uno de aquellos / Un vals para Jazmín
 Me gusta el vino / Niña (ALBA)
 Tonada de las comidas / Cuando yo sea grande (ALBA)
 Todo lo que tengo es mi ciudad / Como cada día (RCA)
 1972 - Polka / Cero a cero
 1972 - El presupuesto / A ti
 1973 - Benaiga la buena suerte / El huacho Jacinto
 1973 - De algunas señoras / Pum-pum te maté

Collaborations 
 1973 - Primer festival internacional de la canción popular
 198? - Chile ríe y canta (álbum)|Chile ríe y canta

References

External Links
 
 

1942 births
2023 deaths
Chilean musicians
Chilean folk singers
People from Temuco